Jesse Sergent (born 8 July 1988) is a retired New Zealand racing cyclist who rode professionally between 2011 and 2016 for ,  and .

Career
Born in Feilding, Sergent won a bronze medal at the 2008 Summer Olympics in Beijing, as part of the New Zealand team in team pursuit, together with Sam Bewley, Hayden Roulston, Westley Gough and Marc Ryan.

On 10 November 2008, it was announced that Sergent had signed with 's under-23 development team, for 2009 and 2010. He represented New-Zealand at the 2010 Commonwealth Games held in Delhi, India. Sergent won a silver medal in the Individual Pursuit and silver in the Team Pursuit. Sergent, with several other riders, joined the former  team to form , ahead of the 2012 season.

Sergent switched to track cycling for the 2012 London Olympics, where he and his teammates (Sam Bewley, Marc Ryan, Westley Gough) made themselves double Olympic bronze medalists. Aaron Gate was the only rider added to the team.

He started the racing season with New Zealand elite road nations where he placed third.

In 2014, Sergent continued to ride for  – renamed . For the 2014 season Sergent provided support to Fabian Cancellara. Sergent also rode in the Glasgow Commonwealth Games individual road time trial and road race.

Sergent was hit by a neutral service car during the 2015 Tour of Flanders, an accident which kept him out of the sport for three months and resulted in him having three operations. However, in July 2016, Sergent retired from professional cycling at the age of 28.

Major results

2005
 1st  Time trial, Oceania Junior Road Championships
2006
 1st Time trial, National Junior Road Championships
2008
 3rd  Team pursuit, Olympic Games
2009
 1st Stage 1 (TTT) Tour of Southland
 3rd  Team pursuit, UCI Track World Championships
2010
 1st Stage 3 (ITT) Tour of the Gila
 1st Prologue Cascade Cycling Classic
 UCI Track World Championships
2nd  Individual pursuit
3rd  Team pursuit
 Commonwealth Games
2nd  Individual pursuit
2nd  Team pursuit
9th Time trial
 3rd Time trial, National Under-23 Road Championships
 3rd Overall Olympia's Tour
2011
 1st  Overall Driedaagse van West-Vlaanderen
1st Prologue
 1st  Overall Tour du Poitou-Charentes
1st Stage 4 (ITT)
 1st Stage 4 (ITT) Eneco Tour
 2nd  Individual pursuit, UCI Track World Championships
 2nd Time trial, National Road Championships
2012
 2nd Overall Driedaagse van West-Vlaanderen
 3rd  Team pursuit, Olympic Games
 3rd Time trial, National Road Championships
 6th Overall Three Days of De Panne
2013
 7th Overall Volta ao Algarve
2014
 1st Stage 5 Tour of Austria
 5th Time trial, Commonwealth Games
 8th Overall Driedaagse van West-Vlaanderen
2015
 1st Stage 1 (TTT) Tour of Alberta
 3rd Overall Driedaagse van West-Vlaanderen

References

External links

Cyclists at the 2008 Summer Olympics
Cyclists at the 2012 Summer Olympics
Olympic cyclists of New Zealand
Olympic bronze medalists for New Zealand
New Zealand track cyclists
1988 births
Living people
People educated at Palmerston North Boys' High School
Olympic medalists in cycling
New Zealand male cyclists
Cyclists at the 2010 Commonwealth Games
Medalists at the 2012 Summer Olympics
Medalists at the 2008 Summer Olympics
People from Feilding
Commonwealth Games silver medallists for New Zealand
Commonwealth Games medallists in cycling
21st-century New Zealand people
Medallists at the 2010 Commonwealth Games